Afshan Anjum (Hindi: अफ़शां अंजुम) is an Indian television journalist and anchor. She worked as a senior news editor with NDTV India.  Anjum is famous for her coverage of the ICC World Cup Cricket Tournaments, and hosts the daily sports shows Khel India and Googly on NDTV India. She has anchored the popular audience-based chat show Kissa Cricket Ka, and has won the NT Award five times.

Personal life 
Anjum was born in New Delhi. Her father worked at Avery India Ltd. She has two older brothers, one of them a scientist at the International Centre for Genetic Engineering and Biotechnology and another runs a business of his own. She is married to Danish Aziz, who works for UNICEF in development. She currently lives in Srinagar.

Career 
Anjum has a bachelor's degree in journalism from Delhi University and was selected for the British Chevening Scholarships for Young Journalists of India in broadcast journalism with the Thomson Foundation at Cardiff University, Wales, United Kingdom in 2006. She started her career as a reporter with Aaj Tak and went on to join NDTV in 2003. Since then, she has worked her way up from being a reporter to senior news editor for sports.

She gained popularity with her show Kissa Cricket Ka with former Indian Cricketer Navjyot Singh Siddhu.

One of the prominent names in Hindi language sports journalism in India, Anjun has covered some very exciting events in the sporting history of India, including India's historic Tour of Pakistan in 2004 and the iconic ICC World Cup Cricket tournaments in 2007, 2011, and 2015.

Awards and accolades 
Anjum has won the NT Award for 'Best Sports Presenter in Hindi' five times between 2007 and 2014.  She has also won several other prestigious awards such as the Madhav Jyoti Alankar.

She presented Jai Jawan with Cricketer MS Dhoni that won the ITA Award for 'Best Television Event'.

References

Indian women television journalists
Indian television news anchors
Living people
Indian women television presenters
Indian women editors
Indian editors
People from New Delhi
Journalists from Delhi
Women writers from Delhi
21st-century Indian women writers
21st-century Indian writers
21st-century Indian journalists
Year of birth missing (living people)